Fort Greene, North Carolina is a U.S. Army military base located in North Carolina. It was established in 1890 and was used through World War I, World War II, Korea, Vietnam, and present. The facility trains U.S. Army soldiers and National Guard soldiers.

Notable recruits
 Henry Hill

1890 establishments in North Carolina
Greene
Greene